A teleprompter, also known as an autocue, is a display device that prompts the person speaking with an electronic visual text of a speech or script.

Using a teleprompter is similar to using cue cards. The screen is in front of, and usually below, the lens of a professional video camera, and the words on the screen are reflected to the eyes of the presenter using a sheet of clear glass or other beam splitter, so that they are read by looking directly at the lens position, but are not imaged by the lens. Light from the performer passes through the front side of the glass into the lens, while a shroud surrounding the lens and the back side of the glass prevents unwanted light from entering the lens. Mechanically this works in a very similar way to the Pepper's ghost illusion from classic theatre: an image viewable from one angle but not another.

Because the speaker can look straight at the lens while reading the script, the teleprompter creates the illusion that the speaker has memorized the speech or is speaking spontaneously, looking directly into the camera lens. Notes or cue cards, on the other hand, require the presenter to look at them instead of at the lens, which can cause the speaker to appear distracted, depending on the degree of deflection from the natural line of sight to the camera lens, and how long the speaker needs to glance away to glean the next speaking point; speakers who can internalize a full sentence or paragraph in a single short glance timed to natural breaks in the spoken cadence will create only a small or negligible impression of distraction.

The technology has continued to develop, including the following iterations: 
 first mechanical paper roll teleprompters — used by television presenters and speakers at U.S. political conventions in 1952
 dual glass teleprompters — used by TV presenters and for U.S. conventions in 1964 
 computer-based rolls of 1982 and the four-prompter system for U.S. conventions — added a large off-stage confidence monitor and inset lectern monitor in 1996
 replacement of glass teleprompters at U.K. political conferences by several large off-stage confidence monitors in 2006.

'' in the US, and 'Autocue' in Commonwealth and some European countries, were originally trade names, but have become genericized trademarks used for any such display device.

U.S. History

The TelePrompTer Corporation was founded in the 1950s by Fred Barton, Jr., Hubert Schlafly and Irving Berlin Kahn. Barton was an actor who suggested the concept of the teleprompter as a means of assisting television performers who had to memorize large amounts of material in a short time.
Schlafly built the first teleprompter in 1950. It was simply a mechanical device, operated by a hidden technician, located near the camera. The script, in inch-high letters, was printed by a special electric typewriter on a paper scroll, which was advanced as the performer read, and the machines rented for the then-considerable sum of $30 per hour. 

The teleprompter was used for the first time on December 4, 1950, in filming the CBS soap “The First Hundred Years.” It was used by Lucille Ball and Desi Arnaz in 1953 to read commercials on-camera. Jess Oppenheimer, who created I Love Lucy and served for its first five years as its producer and head writer, developed the first "in-the-lens" prompter and was awarded U.S. patents for its creation. His system uses a mirror to reflect a script onto a piece of glass placed in front of the camera lens, thus allowing the reader to look directly into the camera.

The producers of Dragnet (1951 TV series) estimated the use of teleprompters cut the show’s production time by as much as 50% Arthur Godfrey, Raymond Massey, Sir Cedric Hardwicke, and Helen Hayes were early users of the technology.  

The technology soon became a staple of television news and is the primary system used by newscasters today.

In 1952 former President Herbert Hoover used a Schlafly-designed speech teleprompter to address the 1952 Republican National Convention in Chicago. U.S. Governor Paul A. Dever spoke at the 1952 Democratic National Convention, also held in Chicago, using a mechanical-roll teleprompter on a long pole held by a TV technician in the convention audience, while the 1952 Republican National Convention used a smaller teleprompter placed in front of the speaker's rostrum. Mechanical prompters were still being used as late as 1992.

In the early years of teleprompter use by politicians, some saw the device as cheating.  in 1955, Richard L. Neuberger, a Democratic Senator from Oregon, proposed legislation that if a politician used a teleprompter the use of the device had to be noted in the speech.  

The new technology saw quick adoption in the sponsored film industry where cutting production costs made the difference between a film that made money and one that lost money. Cinécraft Productions was the first to advertise the availability of three-camera synchronized filming with a Teleprompter when in 1954 they began to advertise their use of the new technology in Business Screen, a magazine dedicated to the sponsored film industry.  Cinécraft used the technique to film the 1953 to 1960 weekly television series, The Ohio Story. Cinécraft also used the technique for executive desk talks in the 1950s and 60s. 

On January 4, 1954, Dwight Eisenhower was the first President to use a teleprompter for a State of the Union address.

The first personal computer-based teleprompter, CompuPrompt appeared in 1982. It was invented and marketed by Courtney M. Goodin and Laurence B. Abrams in Los Angeles, California. The custom software and specially-redesigned camera hardware ran on the Atari 800 computer, which featured smooth hardware-assisted scrolling. Their company later became ProPrompt, Inc., still in business . Paper-based teleprompting companies Electronic Script Prompting, QTV, and Telescript followed suit and developed their own software several years later when computers powerful enough to scroll text smoothly became available. In January 2010 Compu=Prompt received a Technology and Engineering Emmy Award for "Pioneering Development in Electronic Prompting".

Etymology

The word "TelePrompTer", with internal capitalization, originated as a trade name used by the TelePrompTer Corporation, which first developed the device in the 1950s. The word "teleprompter", with no capitalization, has become a genericized trademark, because it is used to refer to similar systems manufactured by many different companies. Some other common terms for this type of device are:
 Autocue, the trademark of Autocue Group Ltd, most commonly used in Commonwealth countries
 Autoscript is used to brand the devices in the United States
 cueing device
 electronic speech notes
 idiot board (slang)
 prompter

Modern design

Television

Modern teleprompters for news programs consist of a personal computer, connected to video monitors on each professional video camera. In certain systems, the PC connects to a separate display device to offer greater flexibility in setup, distances, and cabling. The monitors are often black-and-white and have the scanning reversed to compensate for the reflection of the mirror. A peripheral device attached has a knob that can be turned to speed up, slow down, or even reverse the scrolling of the text. The text is usually displayed in white letters on a black background for the best readability, while cues are in inverse video (black on white). Difficult words (mainly international names) are spelled out phonetically, as are other particulars like "Nine-eleven" (to specify that the event 9/11 should not be pronounced "nine-one-one", for example).

With the development of inexpensive teleprompter software applications as well as free Web-based teleprompter applets, many different disciplines are now using teleprompters to help them deliver sermons, deliver speeches, and create quality audio recordings. Unlike their more advanced counterparts, these entry-level products work on desktop computers, laptop computers, and even tablet computers to enable the speaker to control the rate and flow of their speech. They are also used by many different organizations and schools to deliver prewritten information by relative novices. They are usually called "personal teleprompters."

Presidential (or glass) teleprompters

Glass teleprompters were first used at the 1956 Democratic National Convention. The inventor of the teleprompter, Hubert Schlafly, explained that he wanted to create a less obtrusive teleprompting system than the ones used at the time. He said, "We developed a 'one-way mirror' device we called the Speech View system... The prompter, hidden in the base, reflected the text on the glass to the speaker while the audience looked through the glass without being aware of the text. Two such prompters, one on the right and one on the left of the speaker allowed him to switch from one to the other and appear to address the entire audience".

Schlafly's company then created a speaker's lectern that included two synchronized glass teleprompters and a range of technological innovations including air conditioning and an adjustable-height speaker's platform. The success of the system led the company to develop a new model for use on TV cameras, with the glass placed directly in front of the lens. The camera "looked through the glass; the performer looked directly at the TV audience and was able to read the text word for word. This device now has worldwide use".

Typically, a screen on either side of the speaker shows mirrored text from upward-facing floor monitors at the base of a stand supporting a one-way mirror at the top, angled down towards the screen. The speaker sees the text on the screen reflected in the mirror, while the audience sees what looks like a sheet of tinted glass on each side of the speaker.

Schlafly's glass teleprompters were also used for the 1956 Republican National Convention, and at both parties' conventions from then on. In 1964, glass teleprompters were used by Robert F. Kennedy, at the time the Attorney General, who served in both the Kennedy and early Johnson Administrations (1961-1964), to deliver his convention speech.

Confidence monitors
In 1996, for the first time, speakers at the Democratic National Convention, held at the United Center in Chicago, Illinois, used a four-teleprompter system: as can be seen at another convention in image (A), the first three prompters are placed to the left, right and in front of the speaker, the latter embedded within the speaker's lectern, enabling the speaker to look down at the lectern without losing his/her place in the text of the speech; while in image (B), the fourth prompter is a large confidence monitor located immediately below the lenses of the TV broadcast cameras, at a distance of several meters/yards from the speaker.

This modification to the traditional two-teleprompter set-up continues to be in use at both the Democratic and Republican parties' national conventions: the two glass teleprompters on either side of the speaker's lectern create the illusion that the speaker is looking directly at the audience in the hall, the monitor embedded in the lectern, together with the fourth, much larger teleprompter screen, known as a 'confidence monitor', placed immediately below the broadcast TV cameras which are located some distance away from the convention stage on a specially-constructed broadcasting gantry. This placement of the center prompter creates the illusion that the speaker is periodically looking straight into the camera lens and thereby appears to directly address the TV audience watching the televised Convention coverage.

In 2006, speakers at the Liberal Democrat Conference, held at the Brighton Centre in Brighton, UK also used a three-screen system (but this time consisting entirely of large off-stage confidence monitors mounted on poles — which are often described outside North America, together with glass teleprompters, as "autocues"), where the skill required for those using it, according to the Liberal Democrats' former leader, Menzies Campbell (2006—2008), is to move their gaze seamlessly from one screen to the other: left, center (near the broadcast TV cameras), right and then back again.

As well as helping the speaker to appear to sometimes directly address the TV audience during his/her speech, this system also allows the speaker — in another case cited, the party's then-new leader, Nick Clegg (2008—2015) — to abandon the podium lectern and roam the stage, speaking with apparent spontaneity but in fact constantly assisted by three large autocue screens placed throughout the conference hall. Ironically, this use of the system was adopted by Clegg to counter the oratorical success of another party leader, David Cameron (later to become British Prime Minister), who bestrode stages while speaking seemingly off-the-cuff, having memorized key parts of his speech.

This use of multiple off-stage confidence monitors also dispenses with the need for glass teleprompters to be present on the conference stage, thereby reducing "stage clutter", and removing the inevitable restrictions on the speaker's movement and field of vision imposed by on-stage glass prompters. The disadvantage of such a system is that the provision of "giant teleprompters" becomes essential to maintaining the illusion of speaking with apparent spontaneity.

Paper Prompter
A Ghanaian video journalist, Emmanuel Kwasi Debrah who got tired of time-wasting during interviews, when subjects get their thoughts mixed up designed a portable device known as Paper Prompter.

It is meant to avoid having to type points on a laptop or on a piece of paper and show it to the interviewee. It is particularly helpful for solo journalists whose attention is often divided between manning the camera and focusing on the interviewee.

The device is made up of a hollow shaft fitted with a cylindrical bar with holes aligning the edge of the bar. The holes are points of attachment to the clip. The sheet of paper is therefore held to the bar by the clips. It is fitted with a bolt to regulate the length of the cylindrical bar depending on the camera or paper size. The tool has a hot shoe adapter to mount on the camera and a cold shoe adapter at the top to accommodate a light or a microphone. As the reporter focuses on his camera, the interviewee looks at the sheet of paper which has the write-ups to help interviewees sail through the interview smoothly. Questions can be written on the teleprompter paper for interviewees to answer without the interviewer interrupting.

Gallery 
Various types of modern teleprompters

See also
 Cue card
 Interrotron, a similar device displaying a live image of an interviewer or interviewee instead of text, allowing both to look straight at the camera

Notes

External links

 1966 Cinécraft production film demonstrating the use of multi-cameras with teleprompters. Source: Hagley Library digital archive
 Kevin Martin, Innovation At Cinécraft: Multi-Camera Production For Television. Hagley Collection Research and News
 Joseph Stromberg, A Brief History of the Teleprompter. Smithsonian Magazine, October 22, 2012

Audiovisual introductions in 1950
American inventions
Film and video technology
Television technology
Television terminology
TelePrompTer Corporation